This is a round-up of the 1964 Sligo Senior Football Championship. The holders and four-in-a-row champions Ballisodare/St. Patrick's, dubbed as the "Pride of the West", were dethroned after a semi-final replay, with Keash the victors. They in turn fell to Curry in the final, thus ending a 42-year wait for the South Sligo club's third title.

First round

Quarter-finals

Semi-finals

Sligo Senior Football Championship Final

References

 Sligo Champion (Summer-Autumn 1964)

Sligo Senior Football Championship
Sligo